Federal Route 3 is a main federal road running along the east coast of Peninsula Malaysia. The  federal highway connects Rantau Panjang (near the border with Thailand) in Kelantan until Johor Bahru in Johor. The entire FT3 highway is gazetted as a part of the Asian Highway Network route 18.

The Federal Route 3 has gained a reputation as one of the best coastal highways in Malaysia and Asia due to the scenic views along the highway, as being recognised by the National Geographic Society and Harian Metro. The Federal Route 3 is named as one of the top 10 coastal highways in Asia by the National Geographic Society, while Harian Metro recognises the FT3 highway as one of the best highways in Malaysia.

Route background

The Federal Route 3 is one of the three north–south backbone federal highways in Peninsular Malaysia; the other two are the Federal Routes 1 and 5. Generally, the Federal Route 3 runs mostly along the east coast of Peninsular Malaysia.

The FT3 highway begins as a divided highway at Johor Bahru Interchange that links with the Federal Route 1, the main trunk road of the central Peninsular Malaysia, at its first kilometer. Then at Kota Tinggi, the FT3 becomes a super two highway until Pekan. However, the FT3 is not a coastal highway yet; it is only at Mersing that the FT3 highway starts to become a coastal highway. At Pekan, the FT3 crosses the Pahang River via the Sultan Abu Bakar Bridge FT3 and proceeds to Kuantan as a divided highway.

At Kuantan, the FT3 concurrents with Gambang–Kuantan Highway FT2 briefly from Exit 254 Jalan Pekan Interchange to Exit 253 Pandan Interchange before the FT3 is diverted to Kuantan Bypass FT3. The Kuantan Bypass FT3 continues as the Kuantan–Kuala Terengganu Road FT3 that runs along the coastline of Terengganu. At Kuala Terengganu, the FT3 highway is diverted to Kuala Terengganu–Kota Bharu Road FT3 that runs along the northern interior region of Terengganu and the plains of northern Kelantan. At Kota Bharu, the FT3 crosses the Kelantan River via the Sultan Yahya Petra Bridge FT3 to Wakaf Bharu before running along the west bank of the Kelantan River to Pasir Mas. At Pasir Mas, the FT3 highway is diverted west towards Rantau Panjang at the Malaysia–Thailand border. At the Malaysia–Thailand border, the FT3 highway crosses the Golok River via the Rantau Panjang–Sungai Golok Bridge and continues as Sungai Padi Road (Route 4056) in Thailand.

History
The Federal Route 3 began as an  short road from Johor Bahru to Sungai Pandan, which formed the present-day Tebrau Highway FT3. It was constructed in 1866 by Dato' Muhamad Salleh bin Perang (also known as Dato' Bentara Luar). The road was later extended to Kota Tinggi, which was completed in 1919. Meanwhile, in 1915, the Kuala Terengganu–Kota Bharu Road FT3 was constructed, which was completed in 1923.

In 1911, the state government of Johor collaborated with the British colonial government to develop a road network from Johor Bahru to Batu Pahat and Muar. As a result, the Batu Pahat–Kluang–Mersing Road was completed in 1919, where the section from Jemaluang to Mersing formed a part of the present-day Federal Route 3. At the same time, another section of road between Kota Tinggi to Jemaluang was constructed to link between both Johor Bahru–Kota Tinggi Road FT3 and Jemaluang–Mersing FT3. In 1939, the Kuantan–Kuala Terengganu Road FT3 and the Kuantan–Pekan Road FT3 (up until Peramu at the north bank of the Pahang River) was constructed.

Unlike major roads in western states of Malaya, the construction progress of the Federal Route 3 was sluggish, due to the lack of economic resources in the eastern states of Malaya. As a result, a gap between Pekan to Endau existed due to very scarce population and swampy terrain. To fill in the gap, the first post-independent Malaysian Minister of Works, Tun V.T. Sambanthan, requested the federal government to allocate a large amount of budget to fund the construction of newer rural roads, as well as the rehabilitation of existing roads. Among these, the longest road projects were the Pekan–Kuala Rompin Road FT3 and Endau–Kuala Rompin Road FT3, both completed in 1962. The completion of both roads had thus concluded the construction of the entire Federal Route 3.

Like its west coastal counterpart, the construction of the Federal Route 3 required a lot of longer bridges. As a result, some major bridges such as the Sultan Yahya Petra Bridge FT3 in Kota Bharu and the Sultan Abu Bakar Bridge in Pekan were constructed as toll bridges to help recovering the construction costs. The Sultan Yahya Petra Bridge FT3 was built in 1962 and was opened on 17 April 1965, while the Sultan Abu Bakar Bridge FT3 was built in 1968 and was opened on 28 February 1970. Meanwhile, another major bridge along the FT3, the Pulau Rusa Bridge FT3 near Kuala Terengganu, was constructed in 1960.

On 1 September 1974, the Kuantan Port Authority was established to build the Kuantan Port. The construction began in 1976 and was fully opened in 1984. As a result, a new roadway bypassing Kuantan was built in order to reduce the road congestion in Kuantan as well as to minimize the road damage caused by heavy vehicles commuting to Kuantan Port. The Kuantan Bypass FT3 was later being upgraded into a divided highway in 2005, which was completed in 2007.

The entire section of the FT3 highway forms the Malaysian section of the Asian Highway Route AH18. As a result, sections of the Federal Route 3 are progressively being upgraded to either super two highways or divided highways. Besides, the Federal Route 3 remains popular as a scenic coastal route of the east coast of Peninsular Malaysia and is unaffected by the presence of the East Coast Expressway Phase 2 (ECE2) E8, due to the fact that the FT3 highway has been recognized by the National Geographic Society as one of the top 10 coastal highways in Asia.

List of junctions and towns (south–north)

References

See also
 Malaysia Federal Route 5 – the west coastal counterpart of the Federal Route 3
 Asian Highway Network
 AH18
 Malaysian Federal Roads system

003